Dino Kartsonakis (born July 20, 1942) is an American pianist of Greek heritage. He is known for his arrangements of religious music for the piano.

Biography
Dino was born in New York City and attended Glad Tidings Tabernacle. He began playing his grandmother's piano at the age of three. The first song he learned was At the Cross. He enrolled in piano lessons at age five. Dino received his professional training at The King's College as well as the Juilliard School of Music. For many years he served as pianist for evangelist Kathryn Kuhlman. Dino traveled extensively and produced well over 50 recordings on his own as well as mainstream labels. He has worked with various other evangelists.

Dino hosted two television shows: the "Dino and Debby Show" in the 1970s with his first wife Deborah Keener, and "The Dino Show" which aired on the former Trinity Broadcasting Network.  Dino described his style as combining the classical and the sacred. His technique has been described as fluid and brilliant and he has been termed the "Christian Liberace" because of his flair, costumes, pianos and jewelry.

Many of his works are religious-based or contemporary arrangements of classical works. Dino also performed in his own show in Branson, Missouri.  Among his accomplishments is production of what is known as the "Peace Series", a collection of CDs featuring more subdued piano arrangements against a backdrop of nature sounds.

Dino performed at Carnegie Hall December 15, 2005. He participated in an auction benefiting Music Cares, a charitable organization that helps struggling musicians and entertainers.

Dino received a participation Grammy Award in 1999 for his work on the soundtrack of the movie The Apostle.

Personal life
In 1974, Dino married his first wife, Deborah Keener, and together they have a daughter, Christina (who is now a singer-songwriter and producer, and goes by the stage name Sugar Dame). After touring as Dino & Debby, the two divorced in 1981. In 1986, Dino married his second and current wife, Cheryl, who is the sister of the late pastor and Gospel music singer, Gary McSpadden, formerly of The Imperials and the Gaither Vocal Band. Cheryl has a daughter from a previous marriage.

In 2007 Dino and Cheryl opened a bakery in Branson, MO called Dino's Cake & Coffee Co. (formerly Dino's 24 Karrot Cake Company). Dino remarked that baking was his passion second only to performing his music. They are a major supplier to the Neiman Marcus stores and cafés.

In 2011 Dino and his wife Cheryl lost their home during a flood in the Branson, Missouri area. Dino lost all of his possessions such as his grand show pianos as well as all of his costumes, industry memorabilia and awards. The Kartsonakis' then started helping the community by doing fundraising concerts to help other victims rebuild their lives and homes.

GMA awards
Eight Gospel Music Association Dove Awards:
1978, 1980, 1981, 1982, 1983, 1986: Instrumentalist of the Year
1993, 1996: Instrumental Album of the Year

Discography
1963: No Greater Love
1964: Your Requests
1969: The Greatest of Miracles
1970: Reflections of Dino 
1972: Kathryn Kuhlman Presents Dino
1972: Christmas with Dino Playing Your Favorite Carols
1973: The Miracle with David Rose
1973: Alleluia
1973: With Love from Dino
1974: Dino Plays Folk Musical Themes
1974: He Touched Me
1975: My Tribute
1975: A Salute to the United States of America
1976: Dino on Tour
1977: Dino Plays Classic Country
1978: Love Song
1979: Just Piano Praise
1979: Rise Again
1980: Rush Hour
1981: Just Piano Praise II
1982: Encore
1983: Just Piano Praise III
1983: Chariots of Fire (Dino's only Grammy nomination for Best Gospel Performance, Male).
1983: Majesty
1984: A Christmas Gift of Love
1984: Great is the Lord
1985: Regal Reign
1986: A Place For Us
1987: A Piano Portrait
1987: A Wonderful Time of the Year
1988: Dino Kartsonakis
1989: Peace in the Midst of the Storm
1990: All Creation Sings
1991: Majestic Peace
1992: Christmas...A Time For Peace
1992: Somewhere in Time
1993: Rhythm of Peace
1994: Miracles
1995: Classical Peace
1996: Quiet Time
1997: Moonlight Sonata
1997: The Apostle Soundtrack
1997: The Lord's Prayer
1997: Unforgettable
1998: A Christmas Celebration
1999: Quiet Romance
2000: Quiet Inspiration
2002: Somewhere in Christmastime
2007: Birthday of the King

Compilations
1976: Christmas with Dino
1985: Encore
1998: Dino Collector's Series
2007: Sacred Piano Hymns

Video
1987: A Concert Spectacular
1998: Music For All Time
2000: Christmas Extravaganza
2002: Easter Spring Spectacular
2007: Birthday of the King

References

American television evangelists
American performers of Christian music
Living people
1942 births
Grammy Award winners
Performers of contemporary Christian music
People from Branson, Missouri
Musicians from New York City
Juilliard School alumni
American people of Greek descent